K24 TV, is a TV station in Kenya established in 2007, and launched on February 4, 2008. K24 was the first Kenyan television station to stream live on the internet, giving diaspora viewers a taste of real Kenyan stories told in real time.

K24 Kenya receives 3.1 watchime (hours) per week. It is powered by Mediamax Network Ltd which was established in 2009 and now happens to be one of the fastest growing media houses in Kenya. It's the group that houses K24 TV, vernacular station Kameme FM, free newspaper People Daily and several radio stations, namely: Kameme FM, Mayian FM, Emoo Fm, Meru FM and Msenangu FM.

YouTube 
K24 has been posting on YouTube since 2008, the channel has posted more than 3,000 videos and has received more than 416.1 million views and over 1,22 mln subscribers.

Programming 
 
 Weekend with Betty
 Punchline
 Inuka
 K24 This Morning
 K24 Daily Brief
 K24 News Cut
 K24 Mashinani
 K24 Saa Moja
 K24 Evening Edition
 Sweetest Love
 Sports Hub Live
 Jus Kids
 Beatbox
Beating again
 Gabriella
 Riddim Vybz Reloaded
 Party Ready

References 

Television stations in Kenya
Mass media in Kenya